Channa Mohallah is a town in Jacobabad in Sindh, Pakistan. Most residents in Channa mohallah belong to the Channa (tribe). 50% and most of the population of Channa tribe ;and it is most popular area of Jacobabad That known as Channa village . The main places of jacobabad also in Channa Mohallah 
the power grid station and 
Shah Abdul Latif Bhitai Stadium Ground.
Shahbaz Air Base.
Now there is a USAID funded Hospital J.I.M.S:Jacobabad institute of Medical Sciences. Also located in Channa Mohallah this area major of jacobabad city sindh Pakistan

Towns in Pakistan
Populated places in Jacobabad District